Carmen Gisele Castillo Taucher (born 1954) is a Chilean surgeon and academic. She was the Minister of Public Health during the second government of Michelle Bachelet.

Biography
Carmen Castillo Taucher studied at the University of Chile's Faculty of Medicine, graduating as a surgeon. Later, she completed a Master in Public Health degree with a mention in epidemiology at the same university.

She has worked in the public health system as deputy director of the Dr. Luis Gajardo Guerrero Hospital in San Felipe (1988–1989), director of the Aconcagua Health Service (2000–2010), and technical director of the Dr. Jorge Ahumada Lemus Family Health Center in Santa María (2010–2013).

In 2013 she took over as director of the San Felipe Campus of the University of Valparaíso.

On 23 January 2015, Bachelet appointed her Minister of Public Health, replacing Helia Molina, who had resigned on 30 December 2014. She served in this post for the remainder of Bachelet's administration, leaving office on 11 March 2018.

In November 2019, Castillo was one of 690 academics and health professionals to sign an open letter calling for a unified National Health Insurance system.

References

External links
 

1954 births
Chilean Ministers of Health
Chilean surgeons
Living people
University of Chile alumni
Women government ministers of Chile
Women surgeons
Government ministers of Chile